Xan Phillips is an American poet and visual artist from rural Ohio.

Education 
In 2014, Phillips received a Bachelor of Arts from Oberlin College, where they majored in Creative Writing and minored in Africana Studies. While at Oberlin, they served as a board member for the Center for Women and Trans People and completed a two-year research fellowship in Black Poetics. 

They received a  Master of Fine Arts in Poetry from Virginia Tech in 2016.

Writing 
Phillips poetry has been featured in BOMB, Poets.org, Virginia Quarterly Review, The Offing, The Journal, Nashville Review, Ninth Letter, Scalawag, Best Experimental Writing, and We Want It All: An Anthology of Radical Trans Poetics.

Painting 
Phillips' painting has appeared in The Kenyon Review, Poetry Project, and American Poets Magazine.

Awards and distinctions 
Phillips has received fellowships from Oberlin College, Cave Canem (2016–2017), The Conversation Literary Festival (2018),  Callaloo, the Wisconsin Institute for Creative Writing (2019–2020), Brown University (2020–2021), and University of Pittsburgh's Center for African American Poetry and Poetics (2021–2023). 

In 2020, they received Lambda Literary's Judith A. Markowitz Award for Exceptional New LGBTQ Writers.

Publications 

 Reasons for Smoking (2018)
 Hull (2019)

Anthology contributions 

 Bettering American Poetry Volume 2, edited by Amy King, Jayy Dodd, Camile Rankine, Muriel Leung, Sarah Clark, Michael Wasson, Joshua Jennifer Espinoza, and Héctor Ramírez (2017)
 The BreakBeat Poets, Vol. 2: Black Girl Magic, edited by Mahogany L. Browne, Jamila Woods, and Idrissa Simmonds (2018)
 Furious Flower: Seeding the Future of African American Poetry, edited by Joanne V. Gabbin and Lauren K. Alleyne (2019)

References

External links 
 

Living people
Year of birth missing (living people)
Virginia Tech alumni
Transgender writers
Non-binary writers
Oberlin College alumni
Writers from Ohio
African-American poets
LGBT African Americans
People with non-binary gender identities
Poets from Ohio
21st-century African-American writers
21st-century American poets
African Americans in Ohio